The Kerala massacre (not to be confused with  the state in India) was an alleged incident on April 20, 1979 described in American publication The Christian Science Monitor based on reports from Afghans in Pakistani refugee camps. According to these claims, the then Marxist government of Afghanistan's soldiers and policemen drove to a village called Kerala in Kunar Province, eastern Afghanistan, shooting at over one thousand unarmed civilians. The Associated Press had reports of 640 males allegedly put to death in April 1979. These allegations were refuted by the Russian media at the time.

Background 
Kerala was a farming community of 5,000, around 12 miles from the Pakistan border. Much of Kunar Province had seen fighting between the Communist Democratic Republic of Afghanistan Army personnel and rebels hiding near the mountains since the Saur Revolution in 1978. On April 19, the day before the incident, local rebels attacked an army garrison in the nearby town of Chaga Serai. Rebels from Kerala had been harassing provincial capital Assadabad for several weeks, to the extent that a United Nations hydro-electric project in the vicinity had to be abandoned. At around the same time, there was the Herat mutiny in March 1979 and the declaration of "holy war" by rebel leaders based in Pakistan

About 200 armed government troops and police, arrived in tanks in the village on Friday, April 20.  It was alleged that the officers aimed their Kalashnikovs at the men and told them to shout pro-communist slogans. Instead, the men shouted Allahu akbar. The officers then allegedly ordered them to crouch down facing the tanks, and soon after started shooting at them. There were claims that having killed the victims, bulldozers arrived thereafter and buried the bodies in a mass grave. It has been suggested that this was a local initiative taken by government forces based in Kunar. According to one witness, "There was a rumor that Russians were coming to take the women away in buses...But there were no Russians."

Among the dead in the fighting were Wazir Mohammad, a local Communist official who was the principal of the girls' school at nearby Chigha Sarai, and Mohammad Yashteen, also a staunch communist party member, who taught at the local primary school.

The allegations were refuted by Russian media. In particular, the Russian press agency TASS denounced reports published by a number of American publications about the allegations, particularly Newsweek and the Christian Science Monitor. Nikolai Repin, a Tass commentator, charged that the western news media had shattered all records in anti-Soviet propaganda in spreading what he called "the monstrous misinformation" about a massacre. Repin continued:The authors of this falsehood are not in the least embarrassed by the fact that no Soviet officer had actually been in the village of Kerala or even in all of Kunar Province, where the village is situated.... The whole story of a "mass execution" also does not correspond to reality; it is pure invention from start to finish....The fabrications are so vile that they would not even be worth answering had not this deliberate slander against millions of people been spread all over the world.... The falsehood that was fabricated with their participation is a component part of the malicious campaign that is being waged against the USSR and Afghanistan by imperialist propagandaIn October 2015, Sadeq Alamyar was arrested by Dutch police in the Netherlands on suspicion of war crimes, based on a criminal complaint filed in 2008. Alamyar, who was commander of the elite Afghan Army 444th Commando Force at the time, was accused of ordering the killings and for having shot the victims himself. A Khalqist, Alamyar was jailed in the 1980s during the rival Parchamite faction rule of Babrak Karmal before he fled to the Netherlands for asylum. In December 2017 the case against him was dropped because of lack of evidence.

See also
List of massacres in Afghanistan

Reference 

Massacres in Afghanistan
Massacres of men
1979 in Afghanistan
April 1979 events in Asia
Violence against men in Asia